Přibyslavice may refer to the following places in the Czech Republic:

Přibyslavice (Brno-Country District), a municipality and village
Přibyslavice (Prague-East District), a former village
Pribyslavitz, fictional location in Kingdom Come: Deliverance based on Přibyslavice
Přibyslavice (Třebíč District), a municipality and village